Textularia is a genus of textulariid foraminifera. It includes many vagile inbenthic species of normal salinity seawater.

References

Further reading

External links 
 BioLib - Textularia
 WoRMS taxon details: Textularia Defrance, 1824
 

Foraminifera genera
Fossil taxa described in 1824
Extant Pennsylvanian first appearances